Savvas Manousos (born July 4, 1985) is a Greek professional basketball player for Union Dax-Gamarde of the Nationale Masculine 2. Born in Thessaloniki, Greece, he can play both the Power forward and the Center positions. He is 2.08 m (6'10") in height.

Player profile
Manousos is a right-handed, strong player and pesky defender. He can play the Power forward and the Center positions. Manousos played at PAOK youth teams. During 2002-03 season he has contract with the first team, but he was uncapped.

Professional career
Manousos began his professional career in 2005 with KAOD in the Greek 2nd Division. The same year, he joined Panevėžys of the Lithuanian Basketball League, where he stayed until the end of the season. He then played with the Greek 1st Division club AEL 1964, during the 2005–06 season, and then with Strumica during the same season.

He then played for two seasons at Patras with Apollon Patras and Olympiada Patras before joining the Cypriot 1st Division side AEL Limassol. In 2010, he moved to Anagenisi Flogas at Thessaloniki before leaving Greece in order to sign with the Slovak club BK NH Ostrava.

He returned at Greece and joined Doxa Lefkadas, where he stayed for one season. He then played for Lavrio and Ermis Lagkada in the Greek 2nd Division.

On August 23, 2015, he signed with the Greek club Doxa Lefkadas. He then joined Kavala of the Greek 2nd Division. On January 5, 2017, Manousos left Kavala due to financial problems and signed with CB L'Hospitalet of Spain for the rest of the 2016–17 season.

References and notes

External links
RealGM.com Profile
Eurobasket.com Profile
Dreaftexpress.com Profile

1985 births
Living people
A.E.L. 1964 B.C. players
AEL Limassol B.C. players
Apollon Patras B.C. players
BC Lietkabelis players
BK NH Ostrava players
CB L'Hospitalet players
Doxa Lefkadas B.C. players
Greek Basket League players
Greek expatriate basketball people in Spain
Greek men's basketball players
K.A.O.D. B.C. players
Kavala B.C. players
Lavrio B.C. players
Olympias Patras B.C. players
Centers (basketball)
Power forwards (basketball)
Basketball players from Thessaloniki